Sully is a commune in the Saône-et-Loire department in the region of Bourgogne-Franche-Comté in eastern France.

People
It was the birthplace of the President Patrice de MacMahon.

See also
Château de Sully
Communes of the Saône-et-Loire department

References

Communes of Saône-et-Loire